Singularity's Ring is the debut science fiction book by Paul Melko. The novel was published on February 5, 2008 by Tor Books.

Plot
The story is set in a future after a singularity event, which caused the bulk of humanity to disappear. The focus of this event was a huge space station which rings the Earth, and which remains uninhabited after the singularity. Humans who remained on Earth have maintained an industrial technological base, and are working to re-enter space. The majority of humans are now genetically engineered to form pods, groups of 2 to 5 individuals with the ability to form an emergent personality from those individuals.

The story follows a young pod named Apollo Papadopulos who is training to become the captain of a new starship which is to be launched soon. Apollo Papadopulos is composed of five teenagers; Strom, Meda, Quant, Manuel and Moira. The story moves between the points of view of each of these individuals, and that of Apollo Papadopulos itself.

Awards
The novel was awarded the Compton Crook Award for 2009 by the Baltimore Science Fiction Society as well as the Locus Award for Best First Novel in the same year.

Publication history
2008, United States, Tor Books , Pub date February 2008, Hardcover 
2009, United States, Tor Science Fiction , Pub date April 2008, Paperback

References

External links
 Review by Gwyneth Jones

2008 American novels
American science fiction novels
Tor Books books
Debut science fiction novels
2008 debut novels